Orlande Kpassa Lago Liade (born 7 May 1997) is an Ivorian footballer who currently plays as a forward for Polish side Górnik Konin.

Career statistics

Club

Notes

References

1997 births
Living people
Ivorian footballers
Ivorian expatriate footballers
Association football forwards
I liga players
III liga players
IV liga players
Orlande Kpassa
Bytovia Bytów players
Górnik Konin players
Ivorian expatriate sportspeople in Thailand
Expatriate footballers in Thailand
Ivorian expatriate sportspeople in Poland
Expatriate footballers in Poland